Sharashensky is a rural locality (a khutor) and the administrative center of Sharashenskoye Rural Settlement, Alexeyevsky District, Volgograd Oblast, Russia. The population was 760 as of 2010.

Geography 
Sharashensky is located on the right bank of the Kumylga River, 50 km southeast of Alexeyevskaya (the district's administrative centre) by road. Alimov-Lyubimovsky is the nearest rural locality.

References 

Rural localities in Alexeyevsky District, Volgograd Oblast